Ignorance Is Bliss is the fifth studio album by the punk rock band, Face to Face. The album was released in 1999, and was a musical and lyrical departure from the pop-punk or skate-punk influenced music found on previous albums and EPs.

Though an 'EconoLive 2' tour was done in promotion of the album, the band does not currently play any of the songs from the album while touring.  Trever Keith flatly refused to play anything from this album on their minitour, according to an interview video on their official MySpace page. In 2012, the band had a change of heart and decided to go on tour and perform the entire album acoustically. This album's song "The Devil You Know (God's A Man)" is featured in the Buffy the Vampire Slayer first soundtrack album.

The album was reissued in 2012 on Trevor Keith's own label, Antagonist Records, with the songs from Why Aren't You Happy? EP as bonus tracks.

Reception was mainly positive and many noted the shift in style from skate punk to more alternative rock sound.

Track listing
All tracks by Trever Keith and Scott Shiflett except where noted.
"Overcome" (Keith, Shiflett, Chad Yaro) – 3:16
"In Harm's Way" – 4:24
"Burden" – 4:17
"Everyone Hates a Know-It-All" (Keith) – 3:07
"Heart of Hearts" – 4:00
"Prodigal" – 5:13
"Nearly Impossible" – 5:20
"I Know What You Are" – 4:10
"The Devil You Know (God Is a Man) – 3:38
"(A)Pathetic" (Keith, Shiflett, Yaro) – 3:13
"Lost" (Keith) – 4:14
"Run in Circles" – 3:50
"Maybe Next Time" (Keith, Pete Parada) – 3:52

So Why Aren't You Happy? EP
"Bottle Rockets" - 3:13
"So Long" - 4:04
"Questions Still Remain" - 3:52
"Everyone Hates a Know-It-All (acoustic)" - 2:57

Personnel
Trever Keith – guitar, vocals, producer
Chad Yaro – guitar, vocals
Scott Shiflett – bass guitar, background vocals, producer 
Pete Parada – drums

Additional personnel
Chad Blinman – producer, engineer, mixing 
Ramon Breton – mastering 
Steve Croes – conductor, string arrangements  
Dale Lawton – mixing assistant

Charts
Album - Billboard (North America)

References

1999 albums
Face to Face (punk band) albums